Exit is the debut album of underground hip-hop artist k-os, released 26 March 2002 in Canada and 28 January 2003 in the United States by Astralwerks.

The album is an amalgam of an eclectic mix of musical styles, incorporating everything from standard hip-hop beats to reggae, soul and flamenco. Exit was among the top 45 best-selling rap albums in Canada in 2002 and the fifth best-selling rap album of the year in Canada by a Canadian rap artist.

Overview
The track "Entrance" starts off Exit with a comment on the diversity of the album from talk show host John Salley. He asks k-os, "With all this different stuff on this one album, what is it?"  Then, as the track number changes on the LCD display, k-os begins his answer. "Fantastique" itself is more of an introduction piece than "Entrance" is.  The second track introduces k-os and characterizes him.  In this song, he puts forth his mission statement.  He raps that he was happy with his metaphorical girl named Wise, and that he was content with his own wisdom until the "phone rang," which he decided to ignore.  Upon the next ringing, however, he picked up the phone and heard the man on the other end calling him to arms, because "hip-hop is dying."  Though at this point he has characterized himself as something of a rap savior, the chorus depicts him as a humble person.  The major talking point of verse two is the first mention of his aversion to pimps and those who objectify other humans, rapping, "pimps just react to things, men make 'em happen."

After "Fantastique" has come to a close with its spasmodic guitar loop, "EXIT (Call Me)" begins with the listener's first taste of k-os's singing skills.  This ode to escapism, similar to "Hallelujah" from his next album, Joyful Rebellion, combines a beautiful melody, matching k-os's vocals quite well, with a lyric full of hopelessness at the helplessness of the world around him.  This song has the first reference to his apparent amusement at the metamorphosis of glass to sand, which will appear later in "Superstarr Pt. 2."

Track listing

 "Entrance" – 0:19 (Also known as "Intro"; Spoken by John "Spider" Salley.)
 "Fantastique" – 2:52
 "EXIT (Call Me)" – 3:58
 "Heaven Only Knows" – 3:55
 "Superstarr part 1 (Yoshua's Song)" – 3:41 (Also known as "Superstarr Pt. 1".)
 "Freeze" – 3:54
 "The Anthem" – 4:22
 "Patience" – 3:48
 "Higher" – 3:42
 "Masquerade" (featuring Kamau) – 5:37
 "Follow Me" (featuring Red1) – 4:00
 "Superstarr part 2 (Babylon Girl)" – 3:26 (Also known as "Superstarr Pt. 2".)
 "Neutroniks" – 3:52
 "Superstarr Pt. Zero" – 4:51
 "Heaven Only Knows (Remix)" – 4:49 (Remixed by DJ Kemo) [Bonus Track]

NOTE 1: "Neutroniks" and "Superstarr Pt. Zero" are not available on the Canadian version of the album. However, "Neutroniks" appears on the Canadian version of his next album Joyful Rebellion.

NOTE 2: The CD version of the album adds 61 seconds of silence at the end of "Superstarr, Pt. 2", bringing the track's length to 4:05.

Year-end charts

References

K-os albums
2002 debut albums
Astralwerks albums